Antequera Club de Fútbol is a Spanish football team based in Antequera, in the autonomous community of Andalusia. Founded in 1992, it currently plays in Segunda Federación, holding home games at Estadio El Maulí, with a capacity of 6,000 seats.

History
Antequera Club de Fútbol was founded in 1992, through a merger between CD Puerto Malagueño and CD Antequerano. In the 2012-13 season the club won the Primera Andaluza and started the next season in the Group 9 of Tercera División. 

On September 15, 2015 Antequera appointed José Jesús Aybar as a new head coach of the club.

Club background
CD Antequerano — (1939–92)

Season to season

1 season in Segunda División B
2 seasons in Segunda Federación
23 seasons in Tercera División

References

External links
Official website 
Futbolme team profile 
Lapreferente team profile 

Association football clubs established in 1992
Football clubs in Andalusia
Divisiones Regionales de Fútbol clubs
1992 establishments in Spain
Sport in Antequera